Noriega is a reggaeton producer alongside Luny Tunes. The following is an incomplete list of almost every song he has produced.

Discography

Studio albums
 2003: Mas Flow
 2004: Contra la Corriente
 2006: Sin Control

2002
Héctor & Tito - A La Reconquista
 01. Yo Te Buscaba
 07. Caserío (ft. Don Omar)
 08. Tigresa

Las Guanábanas - Guillaera  
 03. Vamos Pa'la Disco

Magnate y Valentino - Rompiendo el Hielo
 01. Intro
 02. Como Es Que Tú Te Vas
 03. Quiero Que Hagas Mujer (ft. Nicky Jam)
 04. Yal
 05. Gata Celosa (ft. Héctor y Tito)
 06. Ven Conmigo
 07. Dime Donde
 08. Bala Contra Bala
 09. Anda
 10. Tú Al Igual Que Yo
 11. Así Es la Vida
 12. Te Buscaré

2003
Ivy Queen - Diva
 07. "Me Acostumbré"
 20. Quiero Saber (ft. Gran Omar) (produced with DJ Nelson and Luny Tunes)

Tego Calderón - El Abayarde
 01. Intro
 03. Al Natural
 10. Guasa Guasa
 16. Lleva y Trae

Vico C - En Honor A La Verdad
 01. Intro
 02. En Honor De La Verdad
 03. Capicú
 04. 5 De Septiembre (Acoustic Version)
 05. Flowowow
 06. Para Mi Barrio
 07. En La Barbería (Skit)
 08. Superman
 09. Masacote
 10. El Bueno, El Malo, y El Feo (ft. Eddie Dee and Tego Calderón)
 11. Yerba Mala
 12. Mi Forma De Tiraera
 13. 5 De Septiembre (Reggaeton Remix)
 14. Para Mi Barrio (Reggaeton Remix)
 15. El Bueno, El Malo, y El Feo (Reggaeton Remix)

DJ Nelson Presenta: Luny Tunes & Noriega - Mas Flow
 02. Cae La Noche - Hector y Tito
 05. Metele Sazon - Tego Calderón
 11. Bella Dama - Yaga & Mackie
 12. La Gata Suelta - Glory
 13. Tu Me Pones Mal - Angel y Khriz
 14. Si Te Preguntan - Nicky Jam
 15. Tu Anda Sola - Jomar
 18. Te Quiero Ver - Cidellis
 19. Quiseria - John Eric
 20. No Seas Nina - Angel Doze

Los Matadores del Genero
 02. Chica Ven - Plan B
 03. Pasto y Pelea - Don Omar
 06. Te Quiero - Nicky Jam
 09. No Te Sientas Sola - Alberto Stylee
 10. Dame Lo Que Tienes - Johnny Prez
 11. Eres Mi Matadora - Karel & Voltio
 12. Yo Soy Tu Hombre - Zion & Lennox
 13. Matador En La Raya - Angel Doze

MVP
 03. Dale Don Dale - Don Omar
 04. ¿Qué Vas A Hacer? - Divino
 09. Baila Pa' Mi - Zion & Lennox

Yaga & Mackie - Sonando Diferente 
 02. Si Tú Me Calientas
 04. Yo Quisiera (ft. Tego Calderón)
 10. Contra El Viento
 12. Princesa (ft. Cheka)

2004
DJ Nelson Presenta: Noriega - Contra la Corriente
 01. Intro
 02. Tócale Bocina - Alexis & Fido
 03. Te Encontraré - Tito El Bambino
 04. No Tengas Miedo - Zion & Lennox
 05. Quítate La Ropa - Tony Dize
 06. Si Te Vas - Kartiel
 07. Yo Tengo El Control - Cheka
 08. Linda Estrella - Baby Rasta
 09. Que Daría Yo - Las Guanábanas
 10. Amiga No Pienses - Ivy Queen
 11. Tú y Yo Nena - John Eric
 12. Como Lo Bailas Tú - Mickey Perfecto
 13. Más Fuerte - Angel y Khriz (ft. Taina)
 14. Vámonos A Toa - Master Joe & O.G. Black
 15. Ven y Baila - Valery
 16. Viento - Ranking Stone
 17. Desespero - Nashly & Voltio
 18. Vuelve A Mí - Yaga & Mackie
 19. Suelta - Johnny Perez
 20. Tú y Yo - Sabios
 21. Escápate Conmigo - Maicol & Manuel
 22. Move Dale Mami - Shaka & Waco
 23. Amiga No Pienses - Ivy Queen (Salsa Remix)

Las Guanábanas - Collection Two
 ???

Tego Calderón - El Enemy de los Guasíbiri
 08. Al Natural (ft. Yandel)

Zion & Lennox - Motivando a la Yal
 11. Hace Tiempo
 12. Mírame
 18. No Me Compares

Baby Rasta & Gringo - Sentenciados
 ???

Desafío
 02. Mix - Don Omar, Tempo, Tego Calderón, Wisin & Yandel, Alexis (produced with Luny Tunes)
 04. En La Disco Bailoteo - Wisin y Yandel (produced with Luny Tunes)
 05. La Vida - Tego Calderon (produced with Luny Tunes)
 07. Baila Conmigo - Zion & Lennox (produced with Luny Tunes)
 08. El Nalgazo - Alexis & Fido (produced with Luny Tunes)
 09. Llegaste - Jomar (produced with Luny Tunes)
 10. Tu Cuerpo En La Disco - Karel & Voltio (produced with Luny Tunes)
 14. Tu Cuerpo Quiero Tocar - Baby Rasta & Gringo (produced with Luny Tunes)
 18. Cae La Noche - Falo (produced with Luny Tunes)
 19. Te Invito Al Party - Los Ganjas (produced with Luny Tunes)
 22. Acercate - Guanabanas (produced with Luny Tunes)

Eddie Dee - 12 Discípulos
12. Que Es La Que Hay - Ivy Queen (produced with Rafi Mercenario)

Divino - Todo A Su Tiempo
 01. Intro
 07. Sola (produced with DJ Blass)

Ivy Queen - Real
 04. Matando (produced with Rafi Mercenario and Monserrate)
 07. Dile (produced with DJ Nelson)
 18. Rebulera (produced with Rafi Mercenario)

2005
Angel & Khriz - Los MVP's
 09. Toda Te Lo Di (produced with Barbosa)

Ivy Queen - Flashback
 13. Quiero Saber (ft. Gran Omar) (produced with Luny Tunes and DJ Nelson)
 15. Amiga No Pienses
 20. Amiga No Pienses (Salsa Remix)

Ricky Martin - Life
 01. Til I Get You
 02. I Won't Desert You
 04. Don't Time Tonight
 05. Life
 09. This Is Good
 10. Save The Dance

Alexis & Fido - The Pitbulls (album)
 ???

2006
Alexis & Fido - Los Reyes Del Perreo
 06. Tocale Bocina (produced with DJ Nelson and DJ Sonic)
 13. Ella Le Gusta (produced with Luny Tunes)

Tito "El Bambino" - Top of the Line
 Corre y Dile (produced with Luny Tunes)

2007
Tito "El Bambino" - It's My Time
 03. La Pelea (produced with Luny Tunes)

Ivy Queen - Sentimiento
 13. Mañana Al Despertar

Ivy Queen - Sentimiento: Platinum Edition
 04. Dime Si Recuerdas (produced with Luny Tunes)

2008
Arcangél - El Fenómeno
 02. Por Amar A Ciegas (produced with Luny Tunes and Tainy)
 03. Él No Se Va an Enterar (produced with Luny Tunes and Tainy)
 07. Ta' Bueno El Ambiente (produced with Noltom)
 21. Por Amar A Ciegas (Hip-Hop Version) (produced with Luny Tunes)

Erre XI - Luny Tunes Presents: Erre XI
 01. Carita Bonita (produced with Luny Tunes)
 03. La Carta (produced with Luny Tunes)
 04. Invisible (produced with Luny Tunes)
 06. Febrero 14 (produced with Luny Tunes and Tainy)
 11. Castigo (produced with Luny Tunes)
 14. Carita Bonita (Trance Version) (produced with Luny Tunes)

El Roockie - Semblante Urbano
 03. Tell Me Why

2009

2010
Ivy Queen - Quiero Amanecer Contigo (Unreleased)
 01. Quiero Amanecer Contigo

2011
Gocho - Mi Musica
03. "Dandole" - Remix (Featuring Jowell and Ivy Queen)

2012
Ivy Queen - Musa
 3. Peligro De Extinción (produced with Predikator)

Production discographies
Reggae discographies
Pop music discographies
Discographies of Puerto Rican artists